Tango is a studio album released by Spanish singer Julio Iglesias on 19 November 1996. This album became his first number-one set on the Billboard Top Latin Albums and the recipient of a nomination for a Grammy Award for Best Latin Pop Album.

Julio went on to win an American Music Award for Tango in the summer of 1998 when he was up against Luis Miguel and son Enrique Iglesias.

Track listing
The information from Billboard.

Charts

Weekly charts

Year-end charts

Sales and certifications

See also
List of number-one Billboard Top Latin Albums from the 1990s
List of number-one Billboard Latin Pop Albums from the 1990s
 List of best-selling Latin albums

References

1996 albums
Julio Iglesias albums
Spanish-language albums
Tango albums
Columbia Records albums